Albert Garzia (born 27 July 1977) is a Maltese composer, musician and music teacher. He started his musical training as an accordionist at an early age under Dorselle Mifsud with whom he also studied piano performance later on. Even though he initially graduated in Industrial Electronics, his fascination for the diverse facets of music led him to experiment in many of its fields.

He started his composition studies with Raymond Schiberras. He completed his B.A. (Hons.) in Music Studies (with First-Class Honours) read concurrently with a Diploma in Sacred Music - both majoring in Composition at the University of Malta. He completed his master's degree in music at the School of Composition and Contemporary Music at the Royal Northern College of Music in Manchester (with Distinction).

Garzia's music ranges from orchestral to chamber combinations and has been performed in a variety of settings including composition competitions. Some of his piano music has also been published for pedagogical use. He has also collaborated with drama companies, choreographers, poets, and film-directors. While being versatile in his approach, his objective is principally an effective musical communication which he strives to achieve by fusing folk elements into a contemporary music language.

In 2004 he joined Maltese modern folk sextet Walter Micallef u l-Ħbieb.

References
 Note Perfect, Times of Malta, 7 December 2007.
 KINDER GARDEN - Collection of Piano Pieces 3 April 2007
 Violin News & Gossip, Op. 2, No. 60 8 September 2006
 One World Beat preview, Times of Malta, 13 March 2004.
 Up Close to Walter Micallef, St. James Cavalier Concerts preview, Times of Malta, 3 July 2004.
 Fading Notes, The Malta Independent, 22 August 2005.
 Kull Buffura Riħ, 23 Marzu 2007.
 Music Matters, The Malta Independent, 1 April 2007.
 Everyday songs, The Malta Independent, 21 April 2007.

1977 births
Living people
Maltese composers
Maltese pianists
Maltese educators